Tagoat is a village in County Wexford, Ireland. It is located on the N25 and R736 roads, to the west of Rosslare Harbour.

The village is located in the historic barony of Forth. It has a Roman Catholic church and a GAA team dedicated to St. Mary.

See also 

 List of towns and villages in Ireland

References 

Towns and villages in County Wexford